The Brewster Central School District is composed of four schools:

 Brewster High School
 Henry H. Wells Middle School
 C. V. Starr Intermediate School
 John F. Kennedy Elementary School

The Town of Southeast surrounds the independent and separately governed  Village of Brewster. Although the Town of Southeast is the larger municipality, the area is commonly referred to as "Brewster," the name recognized by the Post Office.

Schools

Brewster High School

Brewster High School is a comprehensive public secondary school for grades 9 – 12 with an enrollment of approximately 220 a year, students and over 110 teachers and support personnel.

Henry H. Wells Middle School

The Henry H. Wells Middle School was the second school building known to the Brewster Central School District. Opening in 1957, it was known as Brewster High School. At that time, it housed grades 6 - 12. Garden Street School served as the lone elementary building in the district for grades K - 5. Over time, as the district continued to grow, the 'new' Brewster High School could not keep up with the needs of the school community. In 1971, when Brewster High School was opened on Foggintown Road, the existing high school was rededicated as the Henry H. Wells Middle School - a school designed to work with the unique characteristics of the middle school child, grades 6 - 8. As the Brewster community continued to grow and prosper, the Middle School was called upon to assist by taking the 5th graders into their midst to crowded. From September 1990 - January 1998, the Middle School served grades 5 - 8. With the opening of C.V. Starr in January 1998, the building went back to grades 6 - 8.

C. V. Starr Intermediate School

The C. V. Starr Intermediate School was opened in January 1998. The erection of this building helped to solve some of the major overcrowding situations in the elementary schools and the middle school. When the doors were opened, 4th grade students from JFK Elementary and GSS Elementary, along with 5th grade students from the Wells Middle School were taken into a school.

John F. Kennedy Elementary School

John F. Kennedy Elementary School was erected in 1964 with 21 classrooms in the original building. In 1968, ten "open" classrooms were added as the "roundhouse." There was also an expansion of the school cafeteria. During the summer of 2001, the "roundhouse" was renovated and each of the ten classrooms completely enclosed. Four portable classrooms were added in 1988 to accommodate the influx of children.

John F. Kennedy had served as a kindergarten through grade five facility until 1990 when the fifth grade was moved to Henry H. Wells Middle School to accommodate its again growing population. With the building of C.V. Starr Intermediate School in 1998, the fourth grade vacated and JFK now houses kindergarten through second grades.

Garden Street Elementary School

Originally built in the late 19th century, Garden Street School burned to the ground and was rebuilt in 1925. The school served as the sole educational facility in Brewster until the Henry H. Wells "High School" was built in 1957. Over the years, two additions were built. The existing building stands as a 90-year-old landmark for the district and community.

More recently, Garden Street School has served as a kindergarten through fifth grade elementary school facility. In 1990, the fifth grade was moved to H.H. Wells Middle School to alleviate overcrowding at GSS. Eight years later, Garden Street lost its fourth grade students and staff, as they moved to C.V. Starr Intermediate School.

During the year 2011, an article titled Regions Aging Schools Crumble as Finances Falter by Cathey O'Donnell and Gary Stern, was featured in a local newspaper, The Journal News, which is well known throughout the Lower Hudson Valley of Westchester County, New York. The article was about many old school buildings within the region that were in a current state of disrepair, how much it would cost to fix them and which if any might need to be demolished. One of the schools mentioned in the article was Garden Street Elementary School.

The article is quoted as saying, "Consider the fate of 86-year-old Garden Street Elementary in Brewster. Once a K-12 country school, it needs $11.6 million in upgrades for everything from toilet seats to a new elevator. School officials have decided to close it next year and move its students to newer buildings."

The school is now closed. The Garden Street Elementary School fate has not been determined.

As of 2014 Garden Street School has now closed.

In 2019, under the Village of Brewster's 'Urban Renewal Plan', the old school will be transformed into a 'Arts and Cultural Center'.  In addition, it parts will be repurposed to host artists working studios and galleries.

District office
 Dr. Laurie Bandlow, Superintendent of Schools
 Victor Karlsson, Assistant Superintendent for Business
 Brent Harrington, Ed.D., Assistant Superintendent of Human Resources
 Jim Treloar, Director of Information Systems and Information Technology

Board of education
The Board of Education usually meets two Tuesdays each month. The seven members of the Board are elected by the qualified voters of the district to serve without remuneration for three-year terms.

References

External links
 Brewster Central School District Home Page

School districts in New York (state)
Education in Putnam County, New York